Ioannis Mitropoulos (1874 – after 1896) was a Greek gymnast.  He competed at the 1896 Summer Olympics in Athens.

Mitropoulos competed in both the individual and team events of the parallel bars, and the individual rings event.  In the rings event, he gave Greece its first gold medal in gymnastics.  He did not win a medal in the individual parallel bars event, though his ranking is unknown.  In the team event, Mitropoulos was a member of the Ethnikos Gymnastikos Syllogos team that placed third of the three teams in the event, giving him a bronze medal.

References

External links
 

1874 births
Gymnasts from Athens
Gymnasts at the 1896 Summer Olympics
19th-century sportsmen
Greek male artistic gymnasts
Olympic gold medalists for Greece
Olympic bronze medalists for Greece
Olympic gymnasts of Greece
Year of death missing
Olympic medalists in gymnastics
Medalists at the 1896 Summer Olympics
Date of birth missing
Place of death missing